The prime minister of Japan is the head of the executive branch and chief minister of the government of Japan. This is a list of prime ministers of Japan, from when the first Japanese prime minister (in the modern sense), Itō Hirobumi, took office in 1885, until the present day. The office is currently held by Fumio Kishida. Those prime ministers under the Meiji Constitution had a mandate from the emperor. The "electoral mandates" shown are for the lower house of the Imperial Diet that was not constitutionally guaranteed to have any influence on the appointment of the prime minister.

Daijō-daijin
The office of Daijō-daijin (太政大臣, Chancellor of the Realm of Japan) was the equivalent of what would become the office of prime minister. It was an ancient role which had been discontinued in the 18th century and briefly revived during the Meiji era.

Daijō-daijin 
 1871–1885 Sanjō Sanetomi (三条実美) (1837–1891)

The office of Daijō-daijin was abolished in December 1885 with the appointment of Itō Hirobumi in the new position of prime minister.

List of prime ministers

Timeline

Rank by length of total tenures

Relations between Japanese prime ministers

See also
 List of cabinets of Japan
 Deputy Prime Minister of Japan

Notes

References

External links
 Official Website of the Prime Minister of Japan and His Cabinets

Prime Ministers
Japanese prime ministers by time in office
Prime Ministers
Japan
Prime Ministers